The 99th Flying Training Squadron (99 FTS) flies Raytheon T-1 Jayhawks and they have painted  the tails of their aircraft red in honor of the Tuskegee Airmen of World War II fame, known as the "Red Tails," whose lineage the 99 FTS inherited.

The 99th Flying Training Squadron is part of the 12th Flying Training Wing (12 FTW) based at Randolph Air Force Base, Texas. It operates T-1A Jayhawk aircraft conducting flight training for prospective flight instructors in the T-1A at various undergraduate pilot training and undergraduate combat systems officer training bases in the Air Education and Training Command (AETC).

The squadron was originally formed during World War II as the first flying unit for African Americans. Known as the Tuskegee Airmen, the unit served with distinction in the European Theater of Operations. Following the war it served as a flight training unit for four years in the mid and late 1940s until its inactivation. It was re-activated in 1988 to once again fill a flight training role.

History

World War II

The 99th was originally formed as the U.S. Army Air Forces' first African American fighter squadron, then known the 99th Pursuit Squadron. The personnel received their initial flight training at Tuskegee, Alabama earning them the nickname Tuskegee Airmen. The squadron was originally tentatively scheduled to fly air defense over Liberia but was diverted to the Mediterranean Theater of Operations.

Considered ready for combat duty, the 99th was transported to Casablanca, Morocco, on the ' and participated in the North African campaign. From Morocco they traveled by train to Oujda then to Tunis, the location from which they operated against the Luftwaffe. Flyers and ground crew alike were isolated in their initial command, the 33d Fighter Group by the racial segregation practices of the Army and group commander Colonel William Momyer. The flight crews were handicapped by being left with little guidance from battle-experienced pilots except for a week spent with Colonel Philip Cochran. The 99th's first combat mission was to attack the small, but strategic, volcanic island of Pantelleria in the Mediterranean Sea, in preparation for the Allied invasion of Sicily in July 1943. On Friday July 2, 1943, Lieutenant Charles B. Hall of Brazil, Indiana, shot down the first enemy plane for the group. "It is probably the first time in history that a Negro in a pursuit plane has shot down an enemy in aerial combat."
The 99th moved to Sicily where it received a Distinguished Unit Citation for its performance in combat.

Colonel Momyer, however, reported to NAAF Deputy Commander Major General John K. Cannon that the 99th was ineffective in combat and its pilots cowardly, incompetent, or worse, resulting in a critical article in Time Magazine. In response, the House Armed Services Committee convened a hearing to determine whether the Tuskegee Airmen experiment should be allowed to continue. Momyer characterized the 99th pilots of being incompetent because they had seen little air-to-air combat. To bolster the recommendation to scrap the project, a member of the committee commissioned and then submitted into evidence, a report by the University of Texas that purported to prove that African Americans were of low intelligence and incapable of handling complex situations (such as air combat).

Colonel Benjamin O. Davis Jr. forcefully denied the claims by committee members, but only the intervention of Colonel Emmett O'Donnell Jr. prevented a recommendation for disbandment of the squadron from being sent to President Franklin D. Roosevelt. General Henry H. Arnold ordered an evaluation of all Mediterranean Theater of Operations units flying the P-40 Warhawk be undertaken to determine the true merits of the 99th; the results showed the 99th Fighter Squadron to be at least equal to other units operating the fighter.

While operating from North Africa the unit supported the reduction of enemy fortifications on Pantelleria and Tunisia.

The 99th supported Allied invasions of Sicily and Italy and provided close air support to the U.S. 5th Army during its assaults on Foggia and Anzio and for French and Polish armies in their attack on Monastery Hill near Monte Cassino. On January 27 and 28, 1944, Luftwaffe Fw 190 fighter-bombers raided Anzio, where the Allies had conducted amphibious landings on January 22. Attached to the 79th Fighter Group, eleven of the 99th Fighter Squadron's pilots shot down enemy fighters, including Captain Charles B. Hall, who claimed two shot down, bringing his aerial victory total to three. The eight fighter squadrons defending Anzio together, claimed 32 German aircraft shot down, while the 99th claimed the highest score among them with 13.

The squadron earned its second Distinguished Unit Citation on May 12–14, 1944, while attached to the 324th Fighter Group, attacking German positions on Monastery Hill (Monte Cassino), attacking infantry massing on the hill for a counterattack, and bombing a nearby strong point to force the surrender of the German garrison to Moroccan Goumiers.

In mid-1944 the squadron was assigned to conduct bomber escort missions. The unit supported bomber missions over Romania, France, Austria, Czechoslovakia, Poland, Yugoslavia and Greece. For its efforts during the war the squadron was awarded three Distinguished Unit Citations.

Flying Training
Following the war the squadron returned to the United States where it flew training missions under the command of Marion Rodgers until its inactivation in 1949. It was reactivated in 1988 as a flying training unit. With the closure of Williams Air Force Base, Arizona the squadron moved to Randolph Air Force Base, Texas. Today it operates Raytheon T-1 Jayhawk aircraft preparing instructor pilots and instructor combat systems officers conduct undergraduate flight training in the T-1A.

Operations
Operations: World War II

Lineage
 Constituted as the 99th Pursuit Squadron on 19 March 1941
 Activated on 22 March 1941
 Redesignated 99 Fighter Squadron on 15 May 1942
 Redesignated 99th Fighter Squadron, Single Engine on 28 February 1944
 Inactivated on 1 July 1949
 Redesignated 99th Flying Training Squadron on 29 April 1988
 Activated on 1 July 1988
 Inactivated on 1 April 1993
 Activated on 14 May 1993

Assignments
 United States Army Air Corps, 22 Mar 1941
 Air Corps Technical Training Command, 26 March 1941
 Southeast Air Corps Training Center (later Southeast Army Air Forces Training Center), 5 November 1941 (attached to III Fighter Command, 19 August–c. 2 April 1943)
 Twelfth Air Force, 24 April 1943
 XII Air Support Command (later XII Tactical Air Command), 28 May 1943 (attached to 33d Fighter Group, 29 May 1943; 324th Fighter Group, c. 29 June 1943; 33d Fighter Group, 19 July 1943; 79th Fighter Group, 16 October 1943; 324th Fighter Group, 1 April–6 June 1944)
 332d Fighter Group, 1 May 1944 (attached to 86th Fighter Group, 11–30 June 1944)
 477th Composite Group, 22 June 1945
 332d Fighter Group, 1 July 1947 – 1 July 1949
 82d Flying Training Wing, 1 June 1988
 82d Operations Group, 15 December 1991 – 1 April 1993
 12th Operations Group, 14 May 1993 – present

Stations

 Chanute Field, Illinois, 22 March 1941
 Maxwell Field, Alabama, 5 Nov 1941
 Tuskegee Army Air Field, Alabama, 10 November 1941 – 2 April 1943
 Casablanca Airfield, French Morocco, 24 April 1943
 Qued N'ja Airfield, French Morocco, 29 April 1943
 Fardjouna Airfield, Tunisia, 7 Jun 1943
 Licata Airfield, Sicily, Italy, 28 July 1943
 Termini Imerese, Sicily, Italy, 4 September 1943
 Barcellona Pozzo di Gotto, Sicily, Italy, 17 September 1943
 Foggia Airfield, Italy, 17 October 1943
 Madna Airfield, Italy, 22 November 1943

 Capodichino Airport, Italy, 16 January 1944
 Cercola Airfield, Italy, 2 April 1944
 Pignataro Maggiore Airfield, Italy, 10 May 1944
 Ciampino Airfield, Italy, 11 June 1944
 Orbetello, Italy, 17 June 1944
 Ramitelli Airfield, Italy, 6 July 1944
 Cattolica Airfield, Italy, c. 5 May–June 1945
 Godman Field, Kentucky, 22 June 1945
 Blythe Army Air Base, California (October–November 1946)
 Lockbourne Army Air Base (later Lockbourne Air Force Base), Ohio, 13 March 1946 – 1 July 1949
 Williams Air Force Base, Arizona, 1 June 1988 – 1 April 1993
 Randolph Air Force Base, Texas, (14 May 1993 – present)

Aircraft

 Curtiss P-40 Warhawk (1943–1944)
 Bell P-39 Airacobra (1944)
 North American P-51 Mustang (1944–1945)
 Republic P-47 Thunderbolt (1944, 1945–1949)
 Northrop T-38 Talon (1988–1993)
 Raytheon T-1A Jayhawk (1993–present)

See also

References

 Notes

 Citations

Bibliography
 
 
 
 
  

Military units and formations in Texas
0099